Dick Diver is an Australian four-piece indie pop band from Melbourne, Victoria (Australia). The band consists of Rupert Edwards (guitar) and Alistair McKay (guitar), Steph Hughes (drums) and Al Montfort (bass). It took its name from the character Dick Diver in the novel Tender Is The Night by F. Scott Fitzgerald.

Origins and development
Dick Diver was formed in 2008, with guitarists Rupert Edwards and Alistair McKay, drummer Steph Hughes (Boomgates) and bassist Al Montfort (Total Control, UV Race, Lower Plenty et al.). The band have been one of the more successful products of the "New Melbourne Jangle" scene, gaining traction in Australia and overseas. They are also the unwilling pioneers of a joke genre called "dolewave".

In 2009, Dick Diver released their debut EP, Arks Up.

Their debut album, New Start Again, was listed on a number of year's end best-of polls, including from Mess and Noise.

Dick Diver shared a vinyl single with one of Montfort's other bands Lower Plenty, as part of the 2013 singles club series for iconic US label Matador.

Their 2013 album Calendar Days was named by The Guardian as the best Australian album of 2013, and the second best album by Mess and Noise. It appearing on best-of 2013 lists from the Sydney Morning Herald, The Music, Buzzfeed, Faster Louder, Beat, and The Finest Kiss.

Discography

Albums

EPs

Awards

AIR Awards
The Australian Independent Record Awards (commonly known informally as AIR Awards) is an annual awards night to recognise, promote and celebrate the success of Australia's Independent Music sector.

|-
| rowspan="2" | AIR Awards of 2013
| themselves 
| Best Independent Artist
| 
|-
| Calendar Days
| Independent Album of the Year
| 
|-

Australian Music Prize
The Australian Music Prize (the AMP) is an annual award of $30,000 given to an Australian band or solo artist in recognition of the merit of an album released during the year of award. The commenced in 2005.

|-
| 2015
| Melbourne, Florida
| Australian Music Prize
| 
|-

Music Victoria Awards
The Music Victoria Awards (previously known as The Age EG Awards and The Age Music Victoria Awards) are an annual awards night celebrating Victorian music.

! 
|-
| rowspan="2"| Music Victoria Awards of 2013
| themselves
| Best Band
| 
| rowspan="3"| 
|-
| Calendar Days
| Best Album
| 
|-
| Music Victoria Awards of 2015
| Melbourne, Florida
| Best Album
| 
|-

References

Australian indie pop groups
Musical groups established in 2008
Musical groups from Melbourne